Cedrene is a sesquiterpene found in the essential oil of cedar. The two isomers present in the oil are (−)-α-cedrene and (+)-β-cedrene, which differ in the position of a double bond.

See also
 Cedrol, another component of cedar oil

References

Sesquiterpenes
B